Jeffry Johan Romero Corredor (born 4 October 1989) is a Colombian former racing cyclist, who rode professionally between 2008 and 2016 for the , Boyacá es Para Vivirla,  and  teams. He rode in the 2014 Giro d'Italia with the  team.

Major results

2007
 8th Road race, UCI Juniors World Championships
2008
 1st Stage 5 Vuelta a Guatemala
2012
 5th Prueba Villafranca de Ordizia
 10th Gran Premio Nobili Rubinetterie
2014
 1st Stage 2 Vuelta a Colombia
2015
 3rd Road race, National Road Championships

References

External links

1989 births
Living people
Colombian male cyclists
People from Casanare Department